Nolok is a 2019 Bangladeshi romantic comedy-drama film. The film screenplay, produced and directed by Sakib Sonet and Team. It is being produced by Be Happy Entertainment and distributed by Jaaz Multimedia and the story, dialogue, choreography and soundtrack composed by Ferari Forhad. The film features Shakib Khan and Eamin Haque Bobby in the lead roles. The cast also includes Omar Sani, Moushumi, Shahidul Alam Sachchu, Tariq Anam Khan, Supriyo Dutta, Rajatava Dutta and many more.

The shooting of the film commenced on 1 December 2017 and this first phase of the film was shot in 25-day schedule, entirely filmed in Ramoji Film City, Hyderabad, India.

Synopsis
There are two brothers live in a village. Although that two brothers have lot of land and money, but they do not have much work to do. The two brothers love each other very much. There are also two advisors to advise the two of them. Shaon (Shakib Khan), the eldest brother's son, always spends time with his friends. On the other hand, younger brother's daughter Kajal (Bobby Haque) also spends her busy days with her friends. There are fights and quarrels between Shaon and Kajal always going on. But a family feud draws the two closer. The distance between the two brothers continues to grow even centering on the Shaon-Kajal relationship. The story of the film goes through this.

Cast
 Shakib Khan as Shaon Talukdar
 Eamin Haque Bobby as Kajla Talukdar
 Omar Sunny as Jewel Mahmud
 Moushumi
 Tariq Anam Khan as Kader Talukdar
 Rajatava Dutta as Nader Talukdar
 Shahidul Alam Sachchu as Moti
 Supriyo Dutta as Roju
 Nima Rahman as Shaon's mother
 Rebeka Rouf as Suroni
 Raja Dutt as DB Police officials
 Anuvab Mahbub as DB Police officials

Production
The film's Muharat was held on 22 November 2017, at a restaurant in Dhaka, where the production company Be Happy Entertainment announced the name of Rashed Raha as the director of the film.

Soundtrack 

The film's soundtrack is composed by Adit, Ahmed Humayun, JK Majlish, Hridoy Khan and Savvy. The songs from the soundtrack "Shitol Pati" is sung by Asif Akbar. The song written by Ferrari Forhad and composed by Ahmed Humayun.

Footnotes

References

External links 
 

2019 films
2019 romantic drama films
Bengali-language Bangladeshi films
Bangladeshi romantic drama films
2010s Bengali-language films
Films shot at Ramoji Film City